Kaliman Island is the triangular, flat rocky island extending 250 m in south-southeast to north-northwest direction and 80 m wide in Walker Bay, Livingston Island in Antarctica. It is named after Czar Kaliman Asen of Bulgaria (1241–1246 AD).

Location
Formed as result of the retreat of Verila Glacier in the first decade of 21st century. Bulgarian mapping in 2009 and 2017.

Maps
 L.L. Ivanov. Antarctica: Livingston Island and Greenwich, Robert, Snow and Smith Islands. Scale 1:120000 topographic map.  Troyan: Manfred Wörner Foundation, 2009.
 Antarctic Digital Database (ADD). Scale 1:250000 topographic map of Antarctica. Scientific Committee on Antarctic Research (SCAR). Since 1993, regularly upgraded and updated
 L.L. Ivanov. Antarctica: Livingston Island and Smith Island. Scale 1:100000 topographic map. Manfred Wörner Foundation, 2017.

References
 Bulgarian Antarctic Gazetteer. Antarctic Place-names Commission. (details in Bulgarian, basic data in English)
 Kaliman Island. SCAR Composite Gazetteer of Antarctica

External links
 Kaliman Island. Copernix satellite image

Islands of the South Shetland Islands
Bulgaria and the Antarctic